Sergio Mauricio Reyna Piedrahita (born January 26, 1985) is a Colombian football defender, lastly playing for Club Blooming in the Bolivian first division and currently a free agent.

Career
In January 2010 Zaglebie Lubin signed the centre-back from Peruvian club Inti Gas Deportes. 14.01.2013 he joined Patriotas F.C.

References

External links

www.eurosport.com/football/sergio-reina_prs232771/person.shtml

1985 births
Living people
Footballers from Cali
Association football defenders
Colombian footballers
América de Cali footballers
Atlético F.C. footballers
C.S. Cartaginés players
Patriotas Boyacá footballers
Ayacucho FC footballers
Zagłębie Lubin players
Ekstraklasa players
Club Blooming players
Colombian expatriate footballers
Expatriate footballers in Costa Rica
Expatriate footballers in Peru
Expatriate footballers in Poland
Colombian expatriate sportspeople in Poland
Expatriate footballers in Bolivia